Akbarabad (also Romanized as Akbarābād; also known as ‘Alī Jān-e Pā’īn) is a village in Baqeran Rural District, in the Central District of Birjand County, South Khorasan Province, Iran. At the 2006 census, its population was 106, in 45 families.

References 

Populated places in Birjand County